The pearly-breasted conebill (Conirostrum margaritae) is a species of bird in the family Thraupidae.

Habitat
It is found in Brazil, Bolivia and Peru. Its natural habitat is subtropical or tropical forests.

References

pearly-breasted conebill
Birds of the Peruvian Andes
Birds of the Amazon Basin
pearly-breasted conebill